The Renewed Caledonian Union (UC-R) is a political party in New Caledonia formed by dissidents from the Caledonian Union. It is a member of the National Union for Independence (UNI) coalition, which is in turn a member of the Kanak and Socialist National Liberation Front (FLNKS).

In the latest legislative election of May 10, 2009, it participated in the National Union for Independence (UNI) list in the Loyalty Islands which won 24.66% of the popular vote and 4 seats, one of which was a member of the UC-R.

The party supports independence from and association with France.

References 

Political parties in New Caledonia
Secessionist organizations
Separatism in France
Melanesian socialism
Christian democratic parties in Oceania
Socialist parties in New Caledonia